Gustaf de Geer (22 November 1920 – 23 September 2003) was a Swedish equestrian. He competed in the team jumping event at the 1960 Summer Olympics.

References

1920 births
2003 deaths
Swedish male equestrians
Olympic equestrians of Sweden
Equestrians at the 1960 Summer Olympics
Sportspeople from Stockholm